The British National Time Trial Championships for cycling are held annually. The winners of each event are awarded with a symbolic white cycling jersey featuring blue and red stripes, which can be worn by the rider at other time trial events in the country to show their status as national champion. The champion's stripes can be combined into a sponsored rider's team kit design for this purpose.

Multiple winners

Men

Women

Men

Elite

Under 23

Women

Elite

Under 23

See also
British National Road Race Championships

References

External links

Men's results on cyclebase.nl
Women's results on cyclebase.nl

Cycle racing in the United Kingdom
National road cycling championships
National championships in the United Kingdom
Annual sporting events in the United Kingdom